Eva Vedder (born 23 November 1999) is a Dutch tennis player.

Career
Vedder has a career-high singles ranking by the Women's Tennis Association (WTA) of 221, achieved on 9 January 2023. She also has a career-high doubles ranking by the WTA of 112, achieved on 16 January 2023.

Vedder won the biggest title of her career-to-date at the 2022 Torneo Internazionale Femminile Antico Tiro a Volo, where she won the doubles title partnering Andrea Gámiz. She has won three ITF singles titles and 18 ITF doubles titles.

Grand Slam performance timeline

Singles

WTA 125 tournament finals

Doubles: 1 (runner-up)

ITF Circuit finals

Singles: 4 (3 titles, 1 runner-up)

Doubles: 33 (19 titles, 14 runner-ups)

References

External links
 
 

1999 births
Living people
Dutch female tennis players
20th-century Dutch women
21st-century Dutch women